The Newton Theater (now used as a CVS Pharmacy) is located at 3601 12th Street, Northeast, Washington, D.C., in the Brookland neighborhood. The Art Deco building was designed by John Jacob Zink and opened on July 29, 1937. Zink is credited with more than 200 movie theater projects in this region. The first film shown at the Newton Theater was I Met Him in Paris, starring Claudette Colbert and Robert Young.

After the theater closed in the mid-1960s, the Catholic University of America purchased the building, using it until 1971. The Newton Theater resumed screening films in the late 1970s, under the ownership of the Brookland Community Corporation but that, too, ended in 1979. The theater hosted punk rock concerts throughout 1984, featuring bands like Hüsker Dü, Government Issue, Negative Approach, Void, Iron Cross, 9353, Honor Role, and Malefice. The Newton Theater was placed on the National Register of Historic Places in 2007.

See also
 National Register of Historic Places listings in the District of Columbia
 Theater in Washington D.C.
 Atlas Theater and Shops

References

External links 
 http://cinematreasures.org/theaters/7126
 http://brooklandavenue.com/blog/?tag=newton-theater
http://historicsites.dcpreservation.org/items/show/427

Theatres on the National Register of Historic Places in Washington, D.C.
Art Deco architecture in Washington, D.C.
Theatres in Washington, D.C.
Theatres completed in 1937
Event venues established in 1937
1937 establishments in Washington, D.C.
Brookland (Washington, D.C.)